Malhun Hatun (also called Mal Hatun; d. 1326) was the wife of Osman I, the leader of the Ottoman Turks and the founder of the dynasty that established and ruled the Ottoman Empire. She was the mother of Sultan Orhan.

Biography
According to some historians, she was the daughter of the Anatolian Turkish Bey, Ömer Bey. There have been many speculations that she was the daughter of Sheikh Edebali, as most of the historians during the Ottoman period accept that she was indeed his daughter, although her name has been a subject of conflict to this date. Other sources say that she was the daughter of Ömer Abdülaziz Bey, Seljuk Vizier of Anatolia.
 
The 1324 endowment deed for a Dervish Monastery built by Sultan Orhan suggests that his mother was not, as popular historical tradition maintains, Edebali's daughter but rather Mal Hatun, the daughter of one "Umar Bey or Ömer Bey". The title "Bey", used by the princely dynasties of Anatolia, suggests that Mal Hatun's father was a person of some status and authority. One possibility is that he was the eponymous ruler of an "Amouri" (Umeri) Principality, which was located northeast of the emerging Ottoman State and disappeared in the late 13th or the early 14th century.

The Amouri are described by the Byzantine historian George Pachymeres, who says that a son of Umar fought with Osman in one of his first raids against local Byzantine lords (the victory of Baphaion). The Ottomans, according to Pachymeres, went on to assume the role played by Amouri until their demise as the principal aggressor against the Byzantines in the northwest Anatolia. If Pachymeres's report is correct, the timing and the political context are appropriate for a marriage between Osman and Umar Bey's daughter.

In popular culture

Yıldız Çağrı Atiksoy appears as Malhun Hatun in the Turkish TV series Kuruluş: Osman.

See also
Ottoman family tree
Line of succession to the Ottoman throne
Ottoman Emperors family tree (simplified)
List of the mothers of the Ottoman Sultans
List of consorts of the Ottoman Sultans

Further reading

 Peirce, Leslie P., The Imperial Harem: Women and Sovereignty in the Ottoman Empire, Oxford University Press, 1993,  (paperback).
 Bahadıroğlu, Yavuz, Resimli Osmanlı Tarihi, Nesil Yayınları (Ottoman History with Illustrations, Nesil Publications), 15th Ed., 2009,  (Hardcover).

References

14th-century consorts of Ottoman sultans
1323 deaths
Mothers of Ottoman sultans